Jaime Cuesta (born June 19, 1981, in Distrito Federal) is a Mexican professional football midfielder who currently plays for Chiapas in the Primera División de México.

Career
Atlético Celaya, Primera A (Summer 2001 - Winter 2001)

Acapulco, Primera A (2002)

Deportivo Alavés B, (2002–2003)

CF Palencia (2003–2004)

Langreo (2004–2005)

Astur CF (2005–2006)

CD Toledo (2006–2007)

AD Universidad de Oviedo (2007–2008)

Jaguares (Opening 2009)

Ribadesella CF (2011–Actually)

()

References

External links
 

1981 births
Living people
Footballers from Mexico City
Mexican people of Spanish descent
Association football midfielders
Mexican footballers
Atlético Celaya footballers
Deportivo Alavés B players
CF Palencia footballers
UP Langreo footballers
CD Toledo players
Chiapas F.C. footballers
CD Lealtad players
Mexican expatriate footballers
Expatriate footballers in Spain
Mexican expatriate sportspeople in Spain